is a Japanese athlete. She competed in the women's long jump at the 1964 Summer Olympics.

References

1936 births
Living people
Place of birth missing (living people)
Japanese female long jumpers
Japanese female hurdlers
Olympic female long jumpers
Olympic athletes of Japan
Athletes (track and field) at the 1964 Summer Olympics
Asian Games gold medalists for Japan
Asian Games medalists in athletics (track and field)
Athletes (track and field) at the 1962 Asian Games
Medalists at the 1962 Asian Games
Japan Championships in Athletics winners
20th-century Japanese women
21st-century Japanese women